Thomas Theodorus "Pete" Skoglund (25 July 1905 – 2 October 1968) was a New Zealand lawn bowls player.

At the 1950 British Empire Games in Auckland he won the men's fours bronze medal alongside teammates Arthur Engebretsen, Noel Jolly and Fred Russell. Skolgund also competed in the same event at the 1954 British Empire and Commonwealth Games in Vancouver, finishing in sixth place.

He was the brother of politician and cabinet minister Philip Skoglund, whose son Phil Skoglund was also a champion lawn bowls player.

Skoglund died in Auckland in 1968 and his ashes were buried at Purewa Cemetery.

Books
Skoglund, Pete (1966) 'Mr Bowls' - The Pete Skoglund Story, A H & A W Reed, Wellington, New Zealand

References

1905 births
1968 deaths
Sportspeople from Stratford, New Zealand
New Zealand male bowls players
Commonwealth Games bronze medallists for New Zealand
Bowls players at the 1950 British Empire Games
Bowls players at the 1954 British Empire and Commonwealth Games
Burials at Purewa Cemetery
Commonwealth Games medallists in lawn bowls
20th-century New Zealand people
Medallists at the 1950 British Empire Games